Best of B-Boy Records is a compilation album by Boogie Down Productions consisting of recordings for its first label, B-Boy Records. It is the final release to date by KRS-One under the Boogie Down Productions name. Best of B-Boy Records is essentially a repackaging of BDP's debut album Criminal Minded, with several b-sides and singles added.

Track listing
"Poetry"
"South Bronx"
"9mm Goes Bang"
"Word from Our Sponsor"
"Elementary"
"Dope Beat"
"P is Free (Remix)" 
"The Bridge is Over"
"Super-Hoe"
"Criminal Minded"
"P is Free (Original)"
"Advance"
"D-Nice Rocks the House"
"Say No, Brother (Crack Don't Do It)"
"Criminal Minded (Red Alert Mega Mix)"

References

2001 compilation albums
Boogie Down Productions albums
Albums produced by KRS-One